Kancher Deyal is a 1963 Bengali-language Pakistani film. It was written and directed by Zahir Raihan. Anwar Hossain, Sumita Devi, Khan Ataur Rahman in the lead role and others supporting role were portrayed in the film.

Plot
A helpless young woman is raised in her maternal uncle's family. After the death of her mother, her father becomes a vagabond. The girl suddenly wins much money in the lottery. She then struggles against her confining role in society.

Cast

 Anwar Hossain
 Sumita Devi
 Khan Ataur Rahman
 Rani Sarkar
 Inam Ahmed
 Shawkat Akbar
 Abul Khayer
 Roji Samad
 Narayan Chakraborty
 Achia
 B.A. Malek
 Purnima Sen
 Abdul Matin

Music
The film music directed by Khan Ataur Rahman. Shamol Boron Meyeti is a popular song in the film.

Response
Film critic Ahmed Muztaba Zamal, when asked by Cinemaya in 2000 to select the top ten films from Bangladesh, named Kancher Deyal, made when the country was still East Pakistan, as one of the top twelve.

Awards
 In 1965, the film won best film award in Pakistan Film Festival.
 Zahir Raihan received several awards including Best Director's Award.

References

External links
 

Films directed by Zahir Raihan
Bengali-language Pakistani films
Bangladeshi drama films
1960s Bengali-language films